Robert Neale Lind (born November 25, 1942) is an American folk-music singer-lyricist, who helped define the 1960s folk rock movement in the U.S. and UK. Lind is well known for his transatlantic hit record, "Elusive Butterfly", which reached number 5 on both the US and UK charts in 1966. Many musicians have recorded songs by Lind, who continues to write, record and perform.

Early life
Lind was born in Baltimore, Maryland. His parents divorced when he was five, and his mother remarried; his stepfather was in the Air Force, and the family travelled for some years before settling in Denver, Colorado. He became interested in folk music while a student at Western State College in Gunnison, Colorado, and abandoned his studies to become a musician.

Career
In 1965, Lind signed a recording contract with Liberty Records' subsidiary, World Pacific Records, and on that label he recorded "Elusive Butterfly". The single might have done even better on the UK Singles Chart had competition not arisen from established Irish recording artist Val Doonican, who released a cover version of the song at the same time. In the end, both versions of "Elusive Butterfly" made number five in the UK in 1966. Lind also wrote "Cheryl's Goin' Home", which was covered by Adam Faith, the Blues Project, Sonny & Cher, John Otway, the Cascades, and others. Lind's compositions were eventually covered by more than 200 artists. including Cher, Glen Campbell, Aretha Franklin, Dolly Parton, Eric Clapton, Nancy Sinatra, The Four Tops, The Turtles, Richie Havens, Hoyt Axton, The Kingston Trio, Johnny Mathis, The Rokes (with the Italian cover "Ma che colpa abbiamo noi"), and Petula Clark.

Plagued by drug and alcohol problems, Lind gained a reputation in the business for being "hard to work with." In 1969, Lind severed ties with World Pacific.  Three years later, Capitol Records released Since There Were Circles, an album that was well received by critics, but not commercially successful. Lind dropped out of the music industry for a number of years. He was a friend of the writer Charles Bukowski's, who turned him into the character Dinky Summers in his 1978 novel Women and other writings. He has been clean and sober since July 1977.

In 1988, he moved to Florida. He wrote five novels, an award-winning play, and a screenplay, Refuge, which won the Florida Screenwriters' Competition in 1991.

For eight years, he was a staff writer at the supermarket tabloids Weekly World News and Sun. He has been credited as co-creator (with photo artist Dick Kulpa) of the famous "Bat Boy" Weekly World News cover story.

Lind returned to music in 2004, when at the urging of his friend Arlo Guthrie, he played the Guthrie Center in Becket, Massachusetts. Since then Lind has been touring.

Lind established an official website in 2006. That same year, RPM Records reissued the album Since There Were Circles, and Lind self-released the Live at Luna Star album featuring performances of new material. In 2007, Ace Records (UK) released Elusive Butterfly: The Complete 1966 Jack Nitzsche Sessions.

The British band Pulp have a song named after him: "Bob Lind (The Only Way Is Down)", from their album, We Love Life; the song itself follows a similar musical structure to Lind's hit "Elusive Butterfly". A Lind recording, "Cool Summer" was also included on the compilation album, The Trip, compiled by Pulp's Jarvis Cocker and Steve Mackey.

In 2009, filmmaker Paul Surratt completed a concert/documentary DVD called Bob Lind: Perspective.

In October 2012, 41 years after the release of his last studio album, Lind issued a critically acclaimed CD of new music: Finding You Again, produced by veteran rock guitarist Jamie Hoover of the Spongetones and released by Ace Records.

In November 2013, Lind was inducted into the Colorado Music Hall of Fame, along with Judy Collins, The Serendipity Singers, and Chris Daniels. Lind was inducted into the Maryland Entertainment Hall of Fame on November 17, 2019.

In July 2016, Ace Records released a new album of new songs, entitled Magellan Was Wrong. Jamie Hoover was once again involved in the production; other producers were Frank "Rat" Falestra, jazz master Greg Foat, and Lind himself. All songs are originals, with the exception of a folk-style cover of the Tom Paxton classic "Bottle Of Wine".

On February 25, 2022, Ace Records released Something Worse Than Loneliness, Lind’s third album of new music over the last 10 years. It has garnered some of the strongest reviews in his career (8/10 in Uncut and four stars in Shindig!).

Discography

Singles

Albums

DVDs
Bob Lind: Perspective – Research Video (2009)

References

External links
Official website
Bob Lind appreciation website
Spectropop's Bob Lind page has album and touring information.

1942 births
Living people
Musicians from Baltimore
American male singers
American folk guitarists
American male guitarists
Songwriters from Maryland
Folk musicians from Maryland
Verve Forecast Records artists
Singers from Maryland
Guitarists from Maryland
20th-century American guitarists
20th-century American male musicians
American male songwriters